Harpalus attenuatus is a species of ground beetle in the subfamily Harpalinae. It was described by Stephens in 1828.

References

attenuatus
Beetles described in 1828